Yuncheng is a county in the southwest of Shandong province, China. It is the northernmost county-level division of the prefecture-level city of Heze. It borders the Yellow River and Henan (Taiqian County and Fan County) to the north, Liangshan County to the northeast, Jiaxiang County to the east, Juye County to the southeast, and Mudan District to the southwest, and Juancheng County to the west.

Administrative divisions
As 2012, this County is divided to 2 subdistricts, 15 towns and 5 townships.
Subdistricts
 Yunzhou Subdistrict
 Tangta Subdistrict

Towns

Townships

Climate

Transportation
China National Highway 220
Yuncheng railway station

Notable natives
 Peng Liyuan, Spouse of President and paramount leader
 Ma Xingrui, scientist and current party chief of Shenzhen

Notes and references

Counties of Shandong
Heze